The International League of Esperanto-Speaking Teachers (ILEI) is a non-governmental organization with the goals of teaching respect for humanity, life and nature and seeking to further mutual understanding among peoples. Advocating the spread of Esperanto language and culture, the NGO publishes books and journals, organizes international conferences and administers examinations worldwide to certify the qualifications of Esperanto teachers.

Specifically, ILEI is a special interest group affiliated with both UNESCO and the Universal Esperanto Association (UEA). It aims to introduce the Esperanto language into schools at all levels; to teach Esperanto across all subject areas and levels; to research and solve pedagogical problems in language education; to publish modern tutorials, magazines, books and pamphlets; to organize international conferences and seminars, etc.; to oversee international exams for certifying individuals' abilities in speaking and teaching Esperanto;
to partner with governmental and educational institutions, as well as with other organizations whose goals accord with those of ILEI;
and to establish and maintain websites and discussion lists to further these aims.

History
Founded in 1949, the first executive council included Violet C. Nixon, (United Kingdom, president), Einar Dahl (Sweden, secretary-treasurer), Jeanne Dedieu (France) and P. Korte (Netherlands). Subsequent ILEI presidents have included István Szerdahelyi (1985–1988), Edward Symoens (1988–1991), Stefan MacGill (1991–1993), Duncan Charters (1993–1998), Mauro La Torre (1998–2003), Radojica Petrovic (2003–2009); Stefan MacGill (2009-2013) and Mireille Grosjean (2013-)

Revues 
The League edits 2 revues. Both are quarterly and in CMYK color model. 
 Internacia Pedagogia Revuo, international pedagogical revue, is the official organ of the League. This revue has as target audience all teachers, especially language teachers. 
 Juna Amiko, young friend, is a revue for learners and for children, who grow in Esperanto-speaking families, it means the are native speakers. Native Esperanto speakers (Esperanto: denaskuloj or denaskaj esperantistoj) are people who have acquired Esperanto as one of their native languages. From the age of 8 to 10 they can read this newspaper Juna Amiko and discover countries, persons, songs, games and quizzies.

Conferences
ILEI holds conferences, usually every year, with particular themes devoted to culture, tourism and linguistic festivals; most conferences have been in Europe, though Cuba, South Korea, Australia, Japan and Benin have also hosted conferences.

References

External links
 Official website of ILEI
 Edukado.net - For teachers and students of Esperanto
 lernu! - multilingual site for learning Esperanto

Esperanto education
Esperanto culture
Esperanto organizations
Language teacher associations
Multilingualism
Peace education
Organizations established in 1949